This is a list of Turkish film directors.
 Ömer Lütfi Akad - film director
 Fatih Akın - German film director of Turkish descent
 Zeki Alasya - film director, actor
 Mustafa Altıoklar - film director, producer
 Süha Arın - film director
 Remzi Aydın Jöntürk, film director, producer and writer (1938–1988)
 Kutluğ Ataman - film director
 Tunç Başaran - film director (1938–2019)
 Nuri Bilge Ceylan - film director 
 Mehmet Bozdağ - film director 
 Sinan Çetin - film director
 Zeki Demirkubuz - film director
 Haldun Dormen - film director, actor
 Ertem Eğilmez - film director (1929–1989)
 Reha Erdem - film director
 Yılmaz Erdoğan - film director, actor
 Metin Erksan - film director
 Muhsin Ertuğrul - film director (1892–1979)
 Mu Tunc - film director
 Şerif Gören - film director
 Yılmaz Güney - Turkish-Kurdish film director
 Çağan Irmak - film director
 Çetin İnanç - film director
 Türker İnanoğlu - film director
 Sabri Kalic - film director
 Semih Kaplanoğlu - film director
 Ömer Kavur - film director (1944–2005)
 Ceyda Aslı Kılıçkıran - film director and screenwriter
 Ömür Kınay - disabled female short film director
 Zülfü Livaneli - film director, composer
 Ali Özgentürk - film director 
 Ferzan Özpetek - film director
 Zeki Ökten - film director
 Yavuz Özkan - film director
 Halit Refiğ - film director (1934–2009)
 Emre Şahin, film director
 Osman Fahir Seden - film director (1924–1998)
 Osman Sınav - film director
 Türkan Şoray - actress and film director
 Kartal Tibet - film director, actor
 Yavuz Turgul - film director
 Fuat Uzkınay - film director (1889–1956)
 Memduh Ün - film director
 Mennan Yapo, director, screenwriter, producer and actor
 Atıf Yılmaz - film director, (1925–2006)
 Derviş Zaim - novelist and filmmaker (Turkish Cypriot) (born 1964)

 
Film directors
Turkish
Turkish directors